Manuel Amoros (born 1 February 1962) is a French former professional footballer who played as a right-back. He was capped 82 times for France, and played in the UEFA European Championships finals of 1984 and 1992, and the FIFA World Cup finals in 1982 and 1986.

Club career
Born in Nîmes, Gard, Amoros played most of his career for Monaco in the French first division. He missed his penalty in the 1991 European Cup Final for Marseille and subsequently Red Star Belgrade won the match 5–3 on penalties.

International career
Amoros was born in France to Spanish parents, escaping from Francisco Franco's regime. He represented the France national team.

It was his stints with the Tricolor during the 1982 and 1986 World Cups in which he stood out. In the 1982 semi-final against West Germany, he hit the crossbar in the 89th minute, and in the penalty shoot-out he converted his kick before France were eventually eliminated.

In the 1984 European Championships held in France, Amoros showed an egregious side of him when, during the opening game against Denmark, he was sent off for head-butting the Danish midfielder Jesper Olsen. He was banned for three games. However, in the final against Spain, national coach Michel Hidalgo used him as a substitute in a game that Les Bleus won by 2–0 at the Parc des Princes.

At the 1986 World Cup, the 24-year-old Amoros was voted best left-back in the tournament by the international press.

Managerial career
In June 2010, Amoros was appointed national team manager for the Comoros Islands, which coached to September 2010. In January 2012, he was named new coach of Benin, replacing Edme Codjo, who had been in charge since August 2011.

Honours
Monaco
Division 1: 1981–82, 1987–88
Coupe de France: 1984–85

Marseille
Division 1: 1989–90, 1990–91, 1991–92
UEFA Champions League: 1992–93; runner-up: 1990–91

France
UEFA European Championship: 1984
FIFA World Cup third place: 1986

Individual
FIFA World Cup Best Young Player: 1982
Onze d'Argent: 1986
French Player of the Year: 1986
FIFA World Cup All-Star Team: 1986
FIFA XI: 1986

References

External links
 

Profile at Soccerpunter.com

1962 births
Living people
Footballers from Nîmes
French footballers
France international footballers
Association football defenders
AS Monaco FC players
Olympique de Marseille players
Olympique Lyonnais players
Ligue 1 players
UEFA European Championship-winning players
1982 FIFA World Cup players
UEFA Euro 1984 players
1986 FIFA World Cup players
UEFA Euro 1992 players
French football managers
Comoros national football team managers
Benin national football team managers
French expatriate footballers
Expatriate footballers in Monaco
French expatriate football managers
Expatriate football managers in the Comoros
Expatriate football managers in Benin
French expatriate sportspeople in Benin
French expatriate sportspeople in the Comoros
French expatriate sportspeople in Monaco
French people of Spanish descent